This page documents all tornadoes confirmed by various weather forecast offices of the National Weather Service in the United States during April 2017.

United States yearly total

April

April 2 event

April 3 event

April 4 event

April 5 event

April 6 event

April 9 event

April 10 event

April 12 event

April 13 event

April 14 event

April 15 event

April 16 event

April 18 event

April 19 event

April 20 event

April 21 event

April 22 event

April 25 event

April 26 event

April 27 event

April 28 event

April 29 event

April 30 event

See also
 Tornadoes of 2017
 List of United States tornadoes from January to March 2017
 List of United States tornadoes in May 2017

Notes

References

2017 natural disasters in the United States
2017-related lists
Tornadoes of 2017
Tornadoes
2017, 04